José Pi (19 August 1932 – 16 December 1997) was a Spanish sailor. He competed in the Dragon event at the 1960 Summer Olympics.

References

External links
 

1932 births
1997 deaths
Spanish male sailors (sport)
Olympic sailors of Spain
Sailors at the 1960 Summer Olympics – Dragon
Sportspeople from Barcelona